

Given name 
Notable people with the name include:

, Japanese volleyball player
, Japanese footballer
, Japanese voice actor
, Japanese professional wrestler
, Japanese baseball player
, Japanese musician and actor
, Japanese footballer
, Japanese shogi player
, Japanese baseball player
, Japanese badminton player
, Japanese actor
, Japanese footballer
, Japanese shogi player
, Japanese golfer
, Japanese writer and screenwriter
, Japanese rower
, Japanese engineer

Fictional characters:
Taichi Mashima, a character in the manga series Chihayafuru
Taichi Yagami (Tai Kamiya in English dub), a character in the anime series Digimon Adventure
Taichi Yaegashi, a character in the light novel series Kokoro Connect
Taichi Kawanishi (川西 太一), a character from the manga and anime Haikyu!! with the position of middle blocker from Shiratorizawa Academy

Surname 
Taichi is also a Japanese surname. Notable people with the surname include:

, Japanese actress

Japanese-language surnames
Japanese masculine given names